Tegel Foods Limited is a New Zealand poultry producer. The company is involved in breeding, hatching, processing, marketing, sales, and distribution of poultry products across New Zealand and to selected international markets. With over 2,300 employees nationwide, Tegel offers both cage free and free range chickens across a wide range of products. Tegel is independently audited to meet the highest New Zealand animal welfare standards.

International
 
Tegel has products available for international markets across retail, food service and fast food (QSR) channels. It currently exports to the Pacific Islands, Australia, Asia & the Middle East.

Controversy

Sue Kedgley MP, New Zealand Green Party Animal Welfare Spokesperson, lodged a complaint with the New Zealand Advertising Standards Complaints Board in February 2002 about allegedly misleading Tegel promotions.

References

Food and drink companies based in Auckland
Poultry companies
Agriculture companies of New Zealand
Agriculture companies established in 1961
New Zealand companies established in 1961